USS Flambeau is a name used more than once by the U.S. Navy:

 , a brig, was purchased 3 December 1814
 , a Civil War steamer, commissioned 27 November 1861
 , a tanker, built in 1919 by Sun Shipbuilding and Drydock Co., Chester, Pennsylvania

United States Navy ship names